Peter Campbell Martin (March 21, 1920 – March 23, 1996) was a Canadian football player who played for the Saskatchewan Roughriders. He played junior football in Regina. He was included on the Roughriders' Plaza of Honor in 1990.

References

1920 births
1996 deaths
Saskatchewan Roughriders players